Graham Correctional Center is a Level 4 medium-security adult male state prison in Hillsboro, Illinois. The prison opened in 1980 with a capacity of 750 inmates. The current capacity of the prison is 974, though the average daily population is 1,906. The prison's warden is Glen Austin. It houses a residential sex offender program and substance abuse treatment as well as vocational and academic classes for prisoners. The facility also houses an Illinois Department of Corrections (IDOC) Reception and Classification Center.

The prison is mentioned in the 2017 John Scalzi science fiction novel The Dispatcher.

References

External links
Illinois Department of Corrections - Graham Correctional Center

Buildings and structures in Montgomery County, Illinois
Prisons in Illinois
1980 establishments in Illinois